is a Japanese professional shogi player ranked 7-dan.

Early life
Katsumata was born on March 21, 1969, in Zama, Kanagawa. As a junior high school student, Katsumata won the 8th  in 1983. Later that same year, he was accepted into the Japan Shogi Association's apprentice school at the rank of 6-kyū as a student of shogi professional . He was promoted to amateur professional 1-dan in 1986 and was awarded full professional status and the corresponding rank of 4-dan in April 1995.

Promotion history
The promotion history for Katsumata is as follows:

 6-kyū: 1983
 1-dan: 1986
 4-dan: April 1, 1995
 5-dan: April 1, 1999
 6-dan: March 13, 2007
 7-dan: April 1, 2020

References

External links
ShogiHub: Professional Player Info · Katsumata, Kiyokazu

Japanese shogi players
Living people
Professional shogi players
Tokai University alumni
People from Zama, Kanagawa
Professional shogi players from Kanagawa Prefecture
1969 births
Free class shogi players